Ramona Lynn Vogt is a high-energy physicist at Lawrence Livermore National Laboratory.

Education 
Vogt received her Ph.D. in 1989 from the State University of New York at Stony Brook with the thesis topic "Charmonium Interactions with Hadronic Matter".

Career 
Vogt completed postdoctoral fellowships at Lawrence Livermore National Laboratory (LLNL) and at the GSI in Darmstadt, Germany.  She then worked as staff scientist at Lawrence Berkeley National Laboratory before moving back to LLNL. Vogt was elected a Fellow of the American Physical Society (APS) in 2010 and in 2012 served as Chair of the APS Topical Group on Hadronic Physics.

Vogt is the author of “Ultrarelativistic Heavy Ion Collisions” (Elsevier, 2007), .  She is known for her contribution to the understanding of the dynamics of heavy quark and charmonium production in collisions with nuclei and providing guidance for using these probes in experimental investigations of hard dynamics in collisions with nuclei.

Scientific contributions 

Vogt has been an author or co-author on over 200 scientific publications, many of which have been highly cited by other researchers. These include:

  Volume 310, Issue 4, Pages 197-260
 Vogt (2010).  "Cold Nuclear Matter Effects on J/ψ and Υ Production at the CERN Large Hadron Collider (LHC)"  Phys. Rev. C 81, 044903.
 Vogt and Brodsky (1995). "Charmed hadron asymmetries in the intrinsic charm coalescence model" Nucl.Phys. B, 478, pp. 311–334
 Brambilla, Eidelman, Heltsley, Vogt, et al. (2011).  "Heavy quarkonium: progress, puzzles, and opportunities" Eur.Phys.J. C71, 1534.  DOI: 10.1140/epjc/s10052-010-1534-9 
 CMS Collaboration (G. L. Bayatian et al.), 2006. CMS Physics : Technical Design Report Volume 1: Detector Performance and Software. CERN-LHCC-2006-001, CMS-TDR-8-1, available at http://cds.cern.ch/record/922757/files/lhcc-2006-001.pdf 
  CMS Collaboration (G.L. Bayatian et al.), 2007.  CMS technical design report, volume II: Physics performance. J.Phys. G34 (2007) no.6, 995-1579, DOI: 10.1088/0954-3899/34/6/S01

Honors and awards 
 Fellow of the American Physical Society (2010) 
 2012 Chair of the APS Topical Group on Hadronic Physics

References 

Theoretical physicists
20th-century American physicists
21st-century American physicists
American women physicists
Fellows of the American Physical Society
Living people
Women nuclear physicists
American nuclear physicists
Year of birth missing (living people)
20th-century American women scientists
21st-century American women scientists